The Hawkesbury Advocate was an English language broadsheet newspaper published in Windsor, New South Wales, Australia.

History
The Hawkesbury Advocate was published from 1899 - 1900. Rod and Wendy Gow created an index to Hawkesbury local newspapers, including Hawkesbury advocate newspaper index 1899 to 1900 / GOW.

Digitisation
The paper has been digitised as part of the Australian Newspapers Digitisation Program project of the National Library of Australia.

See also
List of newspapers in Australia
 List of newspapers in New South Wales

External links
 
Press timeline: Select chronology of significant Australian press events to 2011   
The birth of the newspaper in Australia 
Australian Newspaper History: A Bibliography Isaacs, Victor, Kirkpatrick, Rod and Russell, John (2004).
Isaacs, Victor; Kirkpatrick, Rod, Two hundred years of Sydney newspapers: A short history, Rural Press Ltd 
Hawkesbury People and Places  
Hawkesbury Advocate Newspaper Index : 1899 to 1900 by Rod Gow and Wendy Gow

References

Defunct newspapers published in Sydney